Emin Bayram (born 2 April 2003) is a Turkish professional footballer who plays as a defender for the Turkish club Galatasaray in the Süper Lig.

Club career

Galatasaray
He played his first match with Galatasaray on 4 December 2019, in the Tuzlaspor match in the Turkish Cup. Although Galatasaray lost 0–2, Bayram was admired for his performance. For the next few UEFA Champions League games, he waited in the booth.

He played his first league match with Galatasaray on 26 January 2020, away from Konyaspor. Bayram, who was included in the game in the extra time, ended the match before he could play much.

Bayram took to the field as the captain of Galatasaray for the first time in his career in the match against Ankaragücü on the 12th of July 2020.

Boluspor (loan)
On 1 February 2021, he signed a loan agreement with the TFF First League team Boluspor. On 12 July 2021, Boluspor, one of the TFF First League teams, hired young defender Bayram from Galatasaray. Bayram, who was loaned to Boluspor at halftime last season, played 10 games in a red-white jersey. The 18-year-old player took the road to the Black Sea team again.

References

External links
 
 
 

2003 births
Living people
Turkish footballers
Turkey youth international footballers
Association football defenders
Galatasaray S.K. footballers
Süper Lig players
Boluspor footballers
TFF First League players